The Rangpur Riders (Rangpuriya/), is a professional cricket team based in Rangpur City, Rangpur. The Riders compete in Bangladesh Premier League (BPL), the premier cricket league in Bangladesh.

The Rangpur Riders joined the league as a member in 2013, prior to the second edition of the tournament. Although the ownership of the team changed multiple times, the team structure has stayed at its original form since the foundation of the team.

In the 5th edition of BPL, they defeated Dhaka Dynamites in the finals to win their first title.

On 16 November 2019, Bangladesh Cricket Board (BCB) announced Incepta Pharmaceuticals as the sponsor of the team, and it was renamed to Rangpur Rangers. The team was excluded from 2021–22 Bangladesh Premier League.

In September 2022, Bashundhara Group acquired the ownership and renamed the team back to Rangpur Riders.

History
The Rangpur Riders was established in 2012, afterward first season of the Bangladesh Premier League. The team was bought by Mustafa Rafiqul Islam, owner of iSports Limited. The franchise right were bought for US$1.1 million at a closed-door auction. Haque Brothers Industries Limited also participated in the bid, but failed to outbid iSports Limited, a sister-concern of Flora Telecom. The Riders joined the tournament in 2013 as the seventh team, representing the newly declared Rangpur Division. The team ownership was transferred to Sohana Sports which is now managed by Bashundhara Group, a pioneering conglomerate of Bangladesh. The team's logo is copied without permission from that of the Midnight Riders, a supporters group for the American MLS soccer side New England Revolution.

Season overview

Debut season

Rangpur Riders were the newest addition to franchise during the second edition of the league. The team began its league run with Nasir Hossain as their icon player, and Abdur Razzak (cricketer) as the captain. Pakistani legendary spinner Saqlain Mushtaq was appointed as the coach. The Riders picked up their first victory against Chittagong Kings, winning by 6 wickets. The team ended the season with five wins, and seven loss, resulting in a point-table tie with Duronto Rajshahi, later dropping off from the playoffs due to lower Net Run Rate than Rajshahi. Nasir Hossain was the highest paid cricketer of the team with a salary of US$208,000.

Season Two

Riders of Hope got its hope for this season when they purchase Shakib Al Hasan as their Icon player for this season in the newly introduced Player Draft policy instead of Bidding like previous 2 seasons.

This season Rangpur Riders hired Shane Jurgensen as their head coach to make a tough team as per their promise in the Player Draft. This season they did pick some well known local players, like- Shakib Al Hasan, Arafat Sunny, Soumya Sarkar, Al-Amin, Saqlain Sajib and few more, along with some classy international T20 specialist Lendl Simmons, Darren Sammy, Sachithra Senanayake, Mohammad Nabi with some experienced face, like Misbah-ul-Haq.

This well balanced team ended the season by capturing 3rd position in the League but could not qualify for the final thanks to loss against Barisal Bulls in the 2nd qualifier after a win against Dhaka Dynamites in the eliminator.

Season Three

Prior to the fourth season, the ownership of the Riders were transferred to Sohana Sports. The team rearranged its playing squad, with Shahid Afridi, Soumya Sarkar, Mohammad Shehzad and many other acclaimed cricketers. Shakib Al Hasan, the icon player from the previous edition was transferred to Dhaka Dynamites. The club also included rising star Babar Azam, hard-hitting all-rounder Dasun Shanaka in their squad and signing Sohag Gazi and Rubel Hossain proved beneficial for the bowling attack. Having Ziaur Rahman in the playing eleven who was also picked in the draft seemed useful as he provided some big hits when batting. Retaining Mohammad Mithun was a good call as he was the second highest run scorer for the team that season and Arafat Sunny took magical figures of 3/0 against Khulna Titans which proves he was also worth retaining.

The Riders started the season strong with a dominating victory against Chittagong Vikings, winning the match by 9 wickets with Mohammad Shahzad scoring 80 runs. The team continued its domination during its second game, getting Khulna Titans all out for 44, the lowest ever total in Bangladesh Premier League. They lost their way later on and finished fifth in the team rankings, thus, not qualifying for the playoffs.

Season Four

Previous icon player Soumya Sarkar left the team, resulting in the team announcing Mashrafe Mortaza as the new icon and captain. They signed Jamaican t20 specialist, Chris Gayle, one of the cleanest hitter of the cricket ball, former New Zealand captain and opener Brendon McCullum and Lankan genuine swinger, Lasith Malinga They also signed two English seam bowling all-rounder David Willey and Ravi Bopara. Their other squad members include West Indian leggie Samuel Badree and more. They Retained Rubel Hossain and Sohag Gazi. Both of them bowled well last season. The third retained player is Mohammad Mithun who was their second highest run scorer last season. They picked English batter Sam Hain, Afghan batting all-rounder Samiullah Shenwari, experienced orthodox spinners Abdur Razzak (cricketer) and more from the draft.

They picked 8 locals and 3 foreigners from the draft which is 1 more than the minimum requirement for each category. Their first pick was Shahriar Nafees, a prominent Bangladeshi batsman. The surprise picks were inexperienced and little-known Afghan slow left-arm wrist-spin bowler Zahir Khan.

Rangpur began their campaign with a win against Rajshahi Kings. They suffered a few defeats on the way but managed to qualify for the playoffs, finished 4th in the league stage, just enough for the qualification. In the eliminator against Khulna Titans, Chris Gayle won them the match with an unbeaten 126. In the 2nd qualifier against Comilla Victorians, Johnson Charles won them the match with his maiden century in t20 cricket. In the final, Chris Gayle once again smacked a hundred, this time a record 146*. The bowlers also did very well which won them their first championship. Their skipper Mashrafe Mortaza has now won 4 BPLs out of 5 for 3 different teams.

Season Five
Riders have retained Mashrafe Mortaza, Mohammad Mithun, Nazmul Islam, Ravi Bopara and Chris Gayle. They have also signed English opener Alex Hales and South African batsmen AB de Villiers. AB will play 9 matches and more if the team advances to the playoffs.

In the draft, they signed the likes of Shafiul Islam, Abul Hasan, Sohag Gazi and Nahidul Islam. They signed Rilee Rossouw, Benny Howell and Oshane Thomas from the international category.

Season Six
The captain Mashrafe Mortaza was released and Shakib Al Hasan, the captain of Dhaka Dynamites, left the team and joined Riders for the season.

Season seven (2019-20)
During the player's direct signing period, a Conflict of Interests aroused between BCB and all other franchise. Subsequently, in September 2019, BCB made some changes in rules and regulations for this season and eliminating all franchises, BCB took over the charge of the current BPL and decided to run this current tournament by the board itself and named the tournament as Bangabandhu BPL T20 2019 in order to pay homage to Sheikh Mujibur Rahman on his birth centenary. Apparently the team was owned by BCB itself but later Incepta Pharmaceuticals became the team sponsor of Rangpur. They renamed it to ‘Rangpur Rangers’.

Records

Kit manufacturers and sponsors

Squads

References

 
Sport in Rangpur, Bangladesh
Cricket clubs established in 2015
Sports clubs in Bangladesh
Bangladesh Premier League teams
2015 establishments in Bangladesh